Maximiliano Eduardo Meza (born 15 December 1992) is an Argentine professional footballer who plays as a winger for Liga MX club Monterrey.

Club career
Meza, off a stint with Club Cambá Porá, was promoted into Gimnasia y Esgrima's first-team in 2012 and subsequently made his professional debut on 10 December against Deportivo Merlo in the Primera B Nacional, he made fourteen league appearances in total in Gimansia's promotion-winning season of 2012–13. In the following season, Meza became a regular for the club as he made thirty-six appearances and scored five goals; the first five goals of his career. Over the next three league campaigns he made fifty-three appearances in all competitions while scoring seven goals, the last coming versus Colón on 23 May 2016.

On 18 September 2016, a week after making his 100th league appearance for Gimnasia, he left the club to sign for fellow Primera División club Independiente. His Independiente debut came in a 2016 Copa Sudamericana Round of 16 match against Brazilian side Chapecoense on 22 September. During the 2017–18 season, Meza made nine appearances and scored three goals in Independiente's 2017 Copa Sudamericana winning campaign. Ahead of January 2019, Meza completed a move to Mexico by joining Monterrey of Liga MX; signing a five-year contract. He was assigned shirt number 32.

Meza made his Monterrey debut on 13 January 2019 against León, before scoring his first goal in his second appearance on 20 January versus Querétaro. Later that year, Meza appeared eight times as the club won the CONCACAF Champions League; coming off the bench in both legs of the final against Tigres UANL. He was later part of the squads that won the 2019–20 Apertura and 2019–20 Copa MX. Meza also appeared in three matches and scored once, versus Al Hilal, at the 2019 FIFA Club World Cup.

International career
In March 2018, Meza was called up to the senior squad for friendlies with Italy and Spain later that month. He made his debut on 27 March against Spain, playing the full ninety minutes of a 6–1 defeat at the Wanda Metropolitano. Meza was selected in Argentina's official squad for the 2018 FIFA World Cup on 21 May, having previously made the preliminary squad on 14 May. He made his first World Cup appearance on 16 June versus Iceland.  He was part of a team that won the friendly Adidas Cup against Mexico in November 2018     He made Lionel Scaloni's initial forty-man squad for the 2019 Copa América, but was removed for the final tournament.

Career statistics

Club

International

Honours
Independiente
Copa Sudamericana: 2017
Suruga Bank Championship: 2018

Monterrey
Liga MX: Apertura 2019
Copa MX: 2019–20
CONCACAF Champions League: 2019, 2021

Individual
CONCACAF Champions League Team of the Tournament: 2021

References

External links

1992 births
Living people
Sportspeople from Corrientes Province
Argentine footballers
Argentina international footballers
2018 FIFA World Cup players
Association football midfielders
Argentine expatriate footballers
Expatriate footballers in Mexico
Argentine expatriate sportspeople in Mexico
Argentine Primera División players
Primera Nacional players
Liga MX players
Club de Gimnasia y Esgrima La Plata footballers
Club Atlético Independiente footballers
C.F. Monterrey players